Kaneh Har (also known as Kanahar and Kandahar) is a village in the Bivanij Rural District, which is in the Central District of Dalahu County, Kermanshah Province, Iran. In the 2006 census, its population was 255, in 59 families. The village is populated by Kurds.

References 

Populated places in Dalahu County
Kurdish settlements in Kermanshah Province